The canton of Fosses is an administrative division of the Val-d'Oise department, Île-de-France region, northern France. It was created at the French canton reorganisation which came into effect in March 2015. Its seat is in Fosses.

It consists of the following communes:

Attainville
Bellefontaine
Belloy-en-France
Châtenay-en-France
Chaumontel
Écouen
Épinay-Champlâtreux
Ézanville
Fontenay-en-Parisis
Fosses
Jagny-sous-Bois
Lassy
Luzarches
Maffliers
Mareil-en-France
Le Mesnil-Aubry
Le Plessis-Gassot
Le Plessis-Luzarches
Puiseux-en-France
Saint-Martin-du-Tertre
Seugy
Viarmes
Villaines-sous-Bois
Villiers-le-Sec

References

Cantons of Val-d'Oise